Kaarel Ird (27 August 1909 Riga – 25 December 1986 Viljandi) was a Soviet and Estonian theatre leader, director and actor.

His theatrical career started in 1932 in Pärnu Töölisteater. Since 1940 he worked at Vanemuine Theatre, being most of time its stage manager, but in the meantime also its head.

1963-1971 and 1980–1985, he was a deputy of Supreme Soviet of the Estonian Soviet Socialist Republic.

In 1936, Ird wed stage actress and theatre director Epp Kaidu.

Awards:
 1946 Estonian SSR merited artist
 1959 Estonian SSR people's artist

Selected filmography

 1947 Life in the Citadel (feature film; role: Western agent)
 1955 Andruse õnn (feature film; role: ?)	
 1973 Tavatu lugu (feature film; role: prosecutor)
 1974 Punane viiul (feature film; role: Broschowski)

References

1909 births
1986 deaths
20th-century Estonian male actors
Actors from Riga
Film people from Riga
People from Kreis Riga
Members of the Central Committee of the Communist Party of Estonia
Members of the Supreme Soviet of the Estonian Soviet Socialist Republic, 1963–1967
Members of the Supreme Soviet of the Estonian Soviet Socialist Republic, 1967–1971
Members of the Supreme Soviet of the Estonian Soviet Socialist Republic, 1980–1985
Members of the Supreme Soviet of the Estonian Soviet Socialist Republic, 1985–1990
Heroes of Socialist Labour
People's Artists of the Estonian Soviet Socialist Republic
People's Artists of the USSR
Recipients of the Order of Lenin
Recipients of the Order of the Red Banner of Labour
Recipients of the USSR State Prize
Estonian male film actors
Estonian male radio actors
Estonian male stage actors
Estonian theatre directors
Soviet drama teachers
Soviet male film actors
Soviet male stage actors
Soviet opera directors
Soviet theatre directors
Burials at Raadi cemetery